The knapsack problem is the following problem in combinatorial optimization:
Given a set of items, each with a weight and a value, determine which items to include in the collection so that the total weight is less than or equal to a given limit and the total value is as large as possible.
It derives its name from the problem faced by someone who is constrained by a fixed-size knapsack and must fill it with the most valuable items. The problem often arises in resource allocation where the decision-makers have to choose from a set of non-divisible projects or tasks under a fixed budget or time constraint, respectively.

The knapsack problem has been studied for more than a century, with early works dating as far back as 1897. The name "knapsack problem" dates back to the early works of the mathematician Tobias Dantzig (1884–1956), and refers to the commonplace problem of packing the most valuable or useful items without overloading the luggage.

Applications
Knapsack problems appear in real-world decision-making processes in a wide variety of fields, such as finding the least wasteful way to cut raw materials, selection of investments and portfolios, selection of assets for asset-backed securitization, and generating keys for the Merkle–Hellman and other knapsack cryptosystems.

One early application of knapsack algorithms was in the construction and scoring of tests in which the test-takers have a choice as to which questions they answer. For small examples, it is a fairly simple process to provide the test-takers with such a choice. For example, if an exam contains 12 questions each worth 10 points, the test-taker need only answer 10 questions to achieve a maximum possible score of 100 points. However, on tests with a heterogeneous distribution of point values, it is more difficult to provide choices. Feuerman and Weiss proposed a system in which students are given a heterogeneous test with a total of 125 possible points. The students are asked to answer all of the questions to the best of their abilities. Of the possible subsets of problems whose total point values add up to 100, a knapsack algorithm would determine which subset gives each student the highest possible score.

A 1999 study of the Stony Brook University Algorithm Repository showed that, out of 75 algorithmic problems related to the field of combinatorial algorithms and algorithm engineering, the knapsack problem was the 19th most popular and the third most needed after suffix trees and the bin packing problem.

Definition 
The most common problem being solved is the 0-1 knapsack problem, which restricts the number  of copies of each kind of item to zero or one.
 maximize 
Here  represents the number of instances of item  to include in the knapsack. Informally, the problem is to maximize the sum of the values of the items in the knapsack so that the sum of the weights is less than or equal to the knapsack's capacity.

The bounded knapsack problem (BKP) removes the restriction that there is only one of each item, but restricts the number  of copies of each kind of item to a maximum non-negative integer value :
 maximize 

 maximize 

One example of the unbounded knapsack problem is given using the figure shown at the beginning of this article and the text "if any number of each box is available" in the caption of that figure.

Computational complexity 
The knapsack problem is interesting from the perspective of computer science for many reasons:
 The decision problem form of the knapsack problem (Can a value of at least V be achieved without exceeding the weight W?) is NP-complete, thus there is no known algorithm that is both correct and fast (polynomial-time) in all cases.
 While the decision problem is NP-complete, the optimization problem is not, its resolution is at least as difficult as the decision problem, and there is no known polynomial algorithm which can tell, given a solution, whether it is optimal (which would mean that there is no solution with a larger V, thus solving the NP-complete decision problem).
 There is a pseudo-polynomial time algorithm using dynamic programming.
 There is a fully polynomial-time approximation scheme, which uses the pseudo-polynomial time algorithm as a subroutine, described below.
 Many cases that arise in practice, and "random instances" from some distributions, can nonetheless be solved exactly.

There is a link between the "decision" and "optimization" problems in that if there exists a polynomial algorithm that solves the  "decision" problem, then one can find the maximum value for the optimization problem in polynomial time by applying this algorithm iteratively while increasing the value of k. On the other hand, if an algorithm finds the optimal value of the optimization problem in polynomial time, then the decision problem can be solved in polynomial time by comparing the value of the solution output by this algorithm with the value of k. Thus, both versions of the problem are of similar difficulty.

One theme in research literature is to identify what the "hard" instances of the knapsack problem look like, or viewed another way, to identify what properties of instances in practice might make them more amenable than their worst-case NP-complete behaviour suggests. The goal in finding these "hard" instances is for their use in public key cryptography systems, such as the Merkle-Hellman knapsack cryptosystem.

Furthermore, notable is the fact that the hardness of the knapsack problem depends on the form of the input. If the weights and profits are given as integers, it is weakly NP-complete, while it is strongly NP-complete if the weights and profits are given as rational numbers. However, in the case of rational weights and profits it still admits a fully polynomial-time approximation scheme.

Solving 
Several algorithms are available to solve knapsack problems, based on the dynamic programming approach, the branch and bound approach or hybridizations of both approaches.

Dynamic programming in-advance algorithm 
The unbounded knapsack problem (UKP) places no restriction on the number of copies of each kind of item. Besides, here we assume that 
 

Observe that  has the following properties:

1.  (the sum of zero items, i.e., the summation of the empty set).

2. 

The second property needs to be explained in detail. During the process of the running of this method, how do we get the weight ? There are only  ways and the previous weights are  where there are total  kinds of different item (by saying different, we mean that the weight and the value are not completely the same). If we know each value of these  items and the related maximum value previously, we just compare them to each other and get the maximum value ultimately and we are done.

Here the maximum of the empty set is taken to be zero. Tabulating the results from  up through  gives the solution. Dividing  by their greatest common divisor is a way to improve the running time.

Even if P≠NP, the  complexity does not contradict the fact that the knapsack problem is NP-complete, since , unlike , is not polynomial in the length of the input to the problem. However, since this runtime is pseudopolynomial, this makes the (decision version of the) knapsack problem a weakly NP-complete problem.

0-1 knapsack problem 

A similar dynamic programming solution for the 0-1 knapsack problem also runs in pseudo-polynomial time. Assume  are strictly positive integers.

We can define  recursively as follows: (Definition A)
 
  if  (the new item is more than the current weight limit)
 if .

The solution can then be found by calculating . To do this efficiently, we can use a table to store previous computations.

The following is pseudocode for the dynamic program:

// Input:
// Values (stored in array v)
// Weights (stored in array w)
// Number of distinct items (n)
// Knapsack capacity (W)
// NOTE: The array "v" and array "w" are assumed to store all relevant values starting at index 1.

array m[0..n, 0..W];
for j from 0 to W do:
    m[0, j] := 0
for i from 1 to n do:
    m[i, 0] := 0

for i from 1 to n do:
    for j from 0 to W do:
        if w[i] > j then:
            m[i, j] := m[i-1, j]
        else:
            m[i, j] := max(m[i-1, j], m[i-1, j-w[i]] + v[i])

This solution will therefore run in  time and  space. 
(If we only need the value m[n,W], we can modify the code so that the amount of memory required is O(W) which stores the recent two lines of the array "m".)

From Definition A, we know that there is no need to compute all the weights when the number of items and the items themselves that we chose are fixed. That is to say, the program above computes more than necessary because the weight changes from 0 to W often. From this perspective, we can program this method so that it runs recursively.

// Input:
// Values (stored in array v)
// Weights (stored in array w)
// Number of distinct items (n)
// Knapsack capacity (W)
// NOTE: The array "v" and array "w" are assumed to store all relevant values starting at index 1.

Define value[n, W]

Initialize all value[i, j] = -1

Define m:=(i,j)         // Define function m so that it represents the maximum value we can get under the condition: use first i items, total weight limit is j
{
    if i == 0 or j <= 0 then:
        value[i, j] = 0
        return

    if (value[i-1, j] == -1) then:     // m[i-1, j] has not been calculated, we have to call function m
        m(i-1, j)

    if w[i] > j then:                      // item cannot fit in the bag
        value[i, j] = value[i-1, j]
    else: 
        if (value[i-1, j-w[i]] == -1) then:     // m[i-1,j-w[i]] has not been calculated, we have to call function m
            m(i-1, j-w[i])
        value[i, j] = max(value[i-1,j], value[i-1, j-w[i]] + v[i])
}

Run m(n, W)

For example, there are 10 different items and the weight limit is 67. So,

Besides, we can break the recursion and convert it into a tree. Then we can cut some leaves and use parallel computing to expedite the running of this method.

To find the actual subset of items, rather than just their total value, we can run this after running the function above:/**
 * Returns the indices of the items of the optimal knapsack.
 * i: We can include items 1 through i in the knapsack
 * j: maximum weight of the knapsack
 */
function knapsack(i: int, j: int): Set<int> {
    if i == 0 then:
        return {}
    if m[i, j] > m[i-1, j] then:
        return {i} ∪ knapsack(i-1, j-w[i])
    else:
        return knapsack(i-1, j)
}

knapsack(n, W)

Meet-in-the-middle 
Another algorithm for 0-1 knapsack, discovered in 1974 and sometimes called "meet-in-the-middle" due to parallels to a similarly named algorithm in cryptography, is exponential in the number of different items but may be preferable to the DP algorithm when  is large compared to n.

 algorithm Meet-in-the-middle is
     input: A set of items with weights and values.
     output: The greatest combined value of a subset.
 
     partition the set {1...n} into two sets A and B of approximately equal size
     compute the weights and values of all subsets of each set
 
     for each subset of A do
         find the subset of B of greatest value such that the combined weight is less than W
 
     keep track of the greatest combined value seen so far

As with the meet in the middle attack in cryptography, this improves on the  runtime of a naive brute force approach (examining all subsets of ), at the cost of using exponential rather than constant space (see also baby-step giant-step).

Approximation algorithms 
As for most NP-complete problems, it may be enough to find workable solutions even if they are not optimal. Preferably, however, the approximation comes with a guarantee of the difference between the value of the solution found and the value of the optimal solution.

As with many useful but computationally complex algorithms, there has been substantial research on creating and analyzing algorithms that approximate a solution. The knapsack problem, though NP-Hard, is one of a collection of algorithms that can still be approximated to any specified degree. This means that the problem has a polynomial time approximation scheme. To be exact, the knapsack problem has a fully polynomial time approximation scheme (FPTAS).

Greedy approximation algorithm 
George Dantzig proposed a greedy approximation algorithm to solve the unbounded knapsack problem. His version sorts the items in decreasing order of value per unit of weight, . It then proceeds to insert them into the sack, starting with as many copies as possible of the first kind of item until there is no longer space in the sack for more.

For the bounded problem, where the supply of each kind of item is limited, the above algorithm may be far from optimal. Nevertheless, a simple modification allows us to solve this case: Assume for simplicity that all items individually fit in the sack ( for all ). Construct a solution  by packing items greedily as long as possible, i.e.  where . Furthermore, construct a second solution  containing the first item that did not fit.

It can be shown that the average performance converges to the optimal solution in distribution at the error rate

Fully polynomial time approximation scheme 
The fully polynomial time approximation scheme (FPTAS) for the knapsack problem takes advantage of the fact that the reason the problem has no known polynomial time solutions is because the profits associated with the items are not restricted. If one rounds off some of the least significant digits of the profit values then they will be bounded by a polynomial and 1/ε where ε is a bound on the correctness of the solution. This restriction then means that an algorithm can find a solution in polynomial time that is correct within a factor of (1-ε) of the optimal solution.

 algorithm FPTAS is 
     input: ε ∈ (0,1]
            a list A of n items, specified by their values, and weights
     output: S' the FPTAS solution
 
     P := max   // the highest item value
     K := ε 
 
     for i from 1 to n do
          := 
     end for
 
     return the solution, S', using the  values in the dynamic program outlined above

Theorem: The set  computed by the algorithm above satisfies , where  is an optimal solution.

Dominance relations
Solving the unbounded knapsack problem can be made easier by throwing away items which will never be needed. Then  cannot appear in the optimal solution, because we could always improve any potential solution containing  by replacing  with the set . Therefore, we can disregard the -th item altogether. In such cases,  is said to dominate .

Finding dominance relations allows us to significantly reduce the size of the search space.  There are several different types of dominance relations, which all satisfy an inequality of the form:

where

Verifying this dominance is computationally hard, so it can only be used with a dynamic programming approach.
This is a generalization of collective dominance, first introduced in and used in the EDUK algorithm. The smallest such  defines the threshold of the item , written  .
This dominance could be efficiently used during preprocessing because it can be detected relatively easily.
Modular dominance Let  be the best item, i.e.  for all . This is the item with the greatest density of value. Formally, and   i.e. .

Variations 

There are many variations of the knapsack problem that have arisen from the vast number of applications of the basic problem. The main variations occur by changing the number of some problem parameter such as the number of items, number of objectives, or even the number of knapsacks.

Multi-objective knapsack problem
This variation changes the goal of the individual filling the knapsack. Instead of one objective, such as maximizing the monetary profit, the objective could have several dimensions. For example, there could be environmental or social concerns as well as economic goals. Problems frequently addressed include portfolio and transportation logistics optimizations.

As an example, suppose you ran a cruise ship. You have to decide how many famous comedians to hire. This boat can handle no more than one ton of passengers and the entertainers must weigh less than 1000 lbs. Each comedian has a weight, brings in business based on their popularity and asks for a specific salary. In this example, you have multiple objectives. You want, of course, to maximize the popularity of your entertainers while minimizing their salaries. Also, you want to have as many entertainers as possible.

Multi-dimensional knapsack problem
In this variation, the weight of knapsack item  is given by a D-dimensional vector  and the knapsack has a D-dimensional capacity vector . The target is to maximize the sum of the values of the items in the knapsack so that the sum of weights in each dimension  does not exceed .

However, the algorithm in is shown to solve sparse instances efficiently. Such instances occur, for example, when scheduling packets in a wireless network with relay nodes. The algorithm from also solves sparse instances of the multiple choice variant, multiple-choice multi-dimensional knapsack.

The IHS (Increasing Height Shelf) algorithm is optimal for 2D knapsack (packing squares into a two-dimensional unit size square): when there are at most five square in an optimal packing.

Multiple knapsack problem
This variation is similar to the Bin Packing Problem. It differs from the Bin Packing Problem in that a subset of items can be selected, whereas, in the Bin Packing Problem, all items have to be packed to certain bins. The concept is that there are multiple knapsacks. This may seem like a trivial change, but it is not equivalent to adding to the capacity of the initial knapsack. This variation is used in many loading and scheduling problems in Operations Research and has a Polynomial-time approximation scheme.

Quadratic knapsack problem
The quadratic knapsack problem maximizes a quadratic objective function subject to binary and linear capacity constraints. The problem was introduced by Gallo, Hammer, and Simeone  in 1980, however the first treatment of the problem dates back to Witzgall in 1975.

Subset-sum problem
The subset sum problem is a special case of the decision and 0-1 problems where each kind of item, the weight equals the value: .  In the field of cryptography, the term knapsack problem is often used to refer specifically to the subset sum problem and is commonly known as one of Karp's 21 NP-complete problems.

The generalization of subset sum problem is called multiple subset-sum problem, in which multiple bins exist with the same capacity. It has been shown that the generalization does not have an FPTAS.

Geometric knapsack problem 
In the geometric knapsack problem, there is a set of rectangles with different values, and a rectangular knapsack. The goal is to pack the largest possible value into the knapsack.

See also

 Bin packing problem
 Change-making problem
 Combinatorial auction
 Combinatorial optimization
 Continuous knapsack problem
 Cutting stock problem
 List of knapsack problems
 Packing problem

Notes

References
  A6: MP9, pg.247.

External links
 Free download of the book "Knapsack problems: Algorithms and computer implementations", by Silvano Martello and Paolo TothSilvano MartelloSilvano MartelloSilvano MartelloSilvano MartelloSilvano Martello
 Lecture slides on the knapsack problem
 PYAsUKP: Yet Another solver for the Unbounded Knapsack Problem, with code taking advantage of the dominance relations in an hybrid algorithm, benchmarks and downloadable copies of some papers.
 Home page of David Pisinger with downloadable copies of some papers on the publication list (including  "Where are the hard knapsack problems?")
 Knapsack Problem solutions in many languages at Rosetta Code
 Dynamic Programming algorithm to 0/1 Knapsack problem
 Knapsack Problem solver (online)
 Solving 0-1-KNAPSACK with Genetic Algorithms in Ruby 
 Codes for Quadratic Knapsack Problem

 Optimizing Three-Dimensional Bin Packing
 Knapsack Integer Programming Solution in Python Gekko (optimization software)

Cryptography
Packing problems
NP-complete problems
Dynamic programming
Combinatorial optimization
Weakly NP-complete problems
Pseudo-polynomial time algorithms